College Park, California may refer to:
College Park, San Jose, Silicon Valley, California
College Park (Caltrain station), a train station in San Jose, California
College Park, Ventura County, California, Ventura County, California